Rhonda Jo Hughes (born Rhonda Weisberg September 28, 1947) is an American mathematician, the Helen Herrmann Professor Emeritus of Mathematics at Bryn Mawr College.

Education
Hughes grew up on the South Side of Chicago. She attended Gage Park High School, where she was a cheerleader and valedictorian of her class. She studied engineering at the University of Illinois at Urbana–Champaign for one and a half years, then left school and worked for six months before resuming her education at the University of Illinois at Chicago on an Illinois State Scholarship studying mathematics. There, she came under the mentorship of Yoram Sagher, who encouraged her to pursue graduate studies in mathematics. She earned a Ph.D. from the same university in 1975, under the supervision of Shmuel Kantorovitz, with a dissertation entitled Semi-Groups of Unbounded Linear Operators in Banach Space.

Career

She began her teaching career at Tufts University then spent a year as a fellow at the Bunting Institute of Radcliffe College. She moved to Bryn Mawr College in 1980, where she served as department chair for six years.
She is the Helen Herrmann professor emeritus of mathematics at Bryn Mawr, and retired in 2011.

She was president of the Association for Women in Mathematics (AWM) 1987–1988.  She has served on the Commission on Physical Science, Mathematics, and Applications of the United States National Research Council.

She and Sylvia Bozeman organized the Spelman-Bryn Mawr Summer Mathematics Program for female undergraduate students from 1992 to 1994. In 1998, they founded the EDGE Program (Enhancing Diversity in Graduate Education), a transition program for women entering graduate programs in the mathematical sciences.
The program is now in its twentieth year.

Her most recent research involves ill-posed problems.

Honors
Hughes received a Distinguished Teaching Award from the Mathematical Association of America in 1997.  In 2004 she received the AAAS Mentor Award for Lifetime Achievement, in 2010 the Gweneth Humphreys Award for Mentorship of Undergraduate Women in Mathematics of the Association for Women in Mathematics, and in 2013 she received the Elizabeth Bingham Award of the Philadelphia Chapter of the Association for Women in Science.

In 2017, she was selected as a fellow of the Association for Women in Mathematics in the inaugural class.

References

External links 
 A Tribute to the Work of Professor Emeritus Rhonda Hughes

1947 births
Living people
20th-century American mathematicians
21st-century American mathematicians
American women mathematicians
University of Illinois Chicago alumni
Tufts University faculty
Bryn Mawr College faculty
Fellows of the Association for Women in Mathematics
20th-century women mathematicians
21st-century women mathematicians
20th-century American women
21st-century American women